Woodstock Road Baptist Church, located in Summertown, Oxford, UK is an evangelical church and is a member of the Fellowship of Independent Evangelical Churches.

History
The church was opened in 1897 as a church for those of the baptist persuasion of the protestant Christian religion following a period of time when a group of people met for open air worship under the leadership of Rev J. H. Moore. The church was built on a plot of land on the Woodstock Road adjacent to the bottom of the newly occupied residential area of Summertown in Oxford. The original church building (known as Victoria Hall, in  commemoration of the  Diamond Jubilee of Queen Victoria), is of white brick with stone facings and capable of holding 100 people. The west wall of the church building was made of wood, with the intention being to expand the building westwards when numbers of attendance required it.

The church was extended in the 1930s by the addition of a brick walled, tin roofed 'hut' which as later roofed over to make a more permanent structure. The church can seat approx. 200 people, though it currently has seating for 120. It was a member of the Baptist Union until the 1980s. The trust deeds of the church were redrawn in the late 1990s by the then pastor Keith Stokes and the church elders. This allowed the church to separate from the Baptist Union due to differences in doctrine. Woodstock Road Baptist Church (also known as WRBC or Woody Road to its members) is a bible believing and preaching church.

The church closed for renovations from September 2012 to December 2012 and then again from September 2013 to April 2014. The church reopened on April 2, 2014.

Church Services
Homegroups meet around and beyond the city on the first, second, and third Wednesdays. Church services are streamed online at Church Services.

Doctrine
The beliefs of the church can be found on the church web site at Doctrine and Beliefs

References

External links
 WRBC Web Site
 WRBC on Google Maps

Churches in Oxford
Fellowship of Independent Evangelical Churches
Baptist churches in Oxford